Speechless may refer to:

Films, plays, books and television
 Speechless (1994 film), a 1994 American film
 Speechless (2012 film) (無言 Wu Yan), a 2012 Hong Kong film
 Speechless (play), a 2011 play by Polly Teale
 Speechless (TV series), an American television comedy series
 Speechless: Silencing the Christians, a 2008 television documentary series hosted by Janet Parshall
 Speechless, a 2001 graphic novel collection by Peter Kuper
 Speechless: Controlling Words, Controlling Minds, a 2021 nonfiction book by political commentator Michael J. Knowles

Music

Albums
 Speechless (Steven Curtis Chapman album)
 Speechless (Fred Frith album)
 Speechless (Kelly Richey album)

Songs
 "Speechless" (Alicia Keys song), 2010
 "Speechless" (Candyland song), 2015
 "Speechless" (Ciara song), 2010
 "Speechless" (D-Side song), 2003
 "Speechless" (Dan + Shay song), 2018
 "Speechless" (Jay Park and Cha Cha Malone song), 2010
 "Speechless" (Lady Gaga song), 2009
 "Speechless" (Melissa O'Neil song), 2005
 "Speechless" (Michael Jackson song), 2001
 "Speechless" (Robin Schulz song), 2018
 "Two Grey Rooms", a 1991 ballad, originally without lyrics and titled "Speechless" by Joni Mitchell
 "Speechless", a 1980 song by City Boy
 "Speechless", a 1985 song by Robert Wyatt from Old Rottenhat
 "Speechless", a 1986 song by Status Quo from In the Army Now
 "Speechless", a 2003 song by Beyoncé Knowles from Dangerously in Love
 "Speechless", a 2005 song by The Veronicas from The Secret Life of...
 "Speechless" (Aladdin song), a song from Disney's remake of Aladdin

See also
 Aphasia, a medical condition resulting in being speechless
 Voiceless